Variegatorubin is a pulvinic acid derivative. It is a red pigment that is present in many members of the Boletales, an order of the division Basidiomycota. It is generated from the oxidation of variegatic acid. Bolete species that contain variegatorubin include Neoboletus luridiformis, Chalciporus piperatus, Rhizopogon roseolus, Exsudoporus frostii, Suillellus luridus, Rubroboletus rhodoxanthus, and R. satanas. Variegatorubin was discovered by Wolfgang Steglich and colleagues, and described as a new compound in 1970.

References

Biological pigments
Polyphenols
Lactones